Ernest Renshaw defeated Ernest Lewis 7–9, 6–1, 8–6, 6–4 in the All Comers' Final, and then defeated the reigning champion Herbert Lawford 6–3, 7–5, 6–0 in the challenge round to win the gentlemen's singles tennis title at the 1888 Wimbledon Championships.

Draw

Challenge round

All comers' finals

Top half

Bottom half

References

External links

Gentlemen's Singles
Wimbledon Championship by year – Men's singles